The seventh season of The Walking Dead, an American post-apocalyptic horror television series on AMC, premiered on October 23, 2016, and concluded on April 2, 2017, consisting of 16 episodes. Developed for television by Frank Darabont, the series is based on the eponymous series of comic books by Robert Kirkman, Tony Moore, and Charlie Adlard. The executive producers are Kirkman, David Alpert, Scott M. Gimple, Greg Nicotero, Tom Luse, and Gale Anne Hurd, with Gimple as showrunner for the fourth consecutive season. The seventh season received mixed reviews from critics. It was nominated for multiple awards and won three, including Best Horror Television Series for the second consecutive year, at the 43rd Saturn Awards.

This season adapts material from issues #100–114 of the comic book series and focuses on the oppressive group of survivors known as the Saviors, led by the vindictive Negan (Jeffrey Dean Morgan). He uses numbers, power and lethal brutality to coerce Rick Grimes (Andrew Lincoln), his group of survivors, and the Alexandria Safe-Zone to make regular offerings of supplies and weapons for the Saviors. Eventually, Rick and his group seek allies to help them confront Negan, including members of the survivor communities of the Hilltop, the Kingdom, Oceanside, and the Scavengers, who have had their own dealings with Negan and the Saviors.

Cast

Main cast
The seventh season features twenty series regulars overall. For the season premiere, Jeffrey Dean Morgan and Austin Amelio were promoted to series regular status, with Morgan added to the opening credits and Amelio listed under "Also starring". After the first episode aired, the cast faced numerous changes: Steven Yeun and Michael Cudlitz were removed from the opening credits, while Alanna Masterson, Josh McDermitt and Christian Serratos were added to the opening credits, respectively, after previously being credited as "Also starring", in the second episode onwards. Tom Payne and Xander Berkeley were also promoted to series regulars in the second episode and beyond.

Starring
 Andrew Lincoln as Rick Grimes, the series' protagonist and leader of Alexandria, who is forced to adapt under the rule of Negan.
 Norman Reedus as Daryl Dixon, the group's primary hunter and a recruiter for Alexandria, who is taken prisoner by Negan.
 Steven Yeun as Glenn Rhee, Maggie's resourceful husband, who stands as the group's moral compass.
 Lauren Cohan as Maggie Greene, Glenn's strong-willed and pregnant wife.
 Chandler Riggs as Carl Grimes, Rick's teenage son, who struggles to maintain his renewed morality that he achieved from residing in Alexandria.
 Danai Gurira as Michonne, a katana-wielding warrior, who has opened up from her previous solitary life and has recently begun a relationship with Rick.
 Melissa McBride as Carol Peletier, an empowered member of the group, whose several tragedies force her to question her ruthless methods.
 Michael Cudlitz as Sgt. Abraham Ford, a former military sergeant, whose reevaluation of his life led him to break up with Rosita and pursue Sasha.
 Lennie James as Morgan Jones, the first survivor Rick had ever encountered, who is questioning the pacifist philosophy he had adopted.
 Sonequa Martin-Green as Sasha Williams, a former firefighter, Abraham's girlfriend and a guard of Alexandria, who has overcome various traumas.
 Jeffrey Dean Morgan as Negan, the manipulative and totalitarian leader of the Saviors, who serves as the primary antagonist of the season.
 Alanna Masterson as Tara Chambler, a caring member of the group, who discovers an all-female community called Oceanside and struggles to keep it a secret.
 Josh McDermitt as Eugene Porter, a survivor who struggles to prove his worth to the group after lying to them about knowing a possible cure to the walker virus.
 Christian Serratos as Rosita Espinosa, a pragmatic and protective member of the group, and ex-girlfriend of Abraham.

Also starring
 Seth Gilliam as Gabriel Stokes, a priest, who has managed to earn the group's trust after previously betraying them.
 Ross Marquand as Aaron, an Alexandrian recruiter, who brought Rick's group to Alexandria and serves as a bridge between the two factions.
 Austin Nichols as Spencer Monroe, a guard of Alexandria and the only surviving member of his family.
 Austin Amelio as Dwight, a ruthless but reluctant member of the Saviors and one of Negan's top lieutenants, who forms a violent, hostile rivalry with Daryl.
 Tom Payne as Paul "Jesus" Rovia, a scout for the Hilltop, who introduced Rick's group to his community.
 Xander Berkeley as Gregory, the selfish and arrogant leader of the Hilltop.

Supporting cast

Alexandria Safe-Zone
 Katelyn Nacon as Enid, an isolated teenager residing in Alexandria, who forms a special bond with Maggie and is starting to show feelings for Carl.
 Jason Douglas as Tobin, a resident of Alexandria and the foreman of the community's construction crew, who had a brief relationship with Carol.
 Corey Hawkins as Heath, a supply runner for Alexandria and Glenn's friend, who left the group to accompany Tara on a two-week supply run.
 Ann Mahoney as Olivia, an Alexandria resident, who is in charge of the community's food and armory.
 Kenric Green as Scott, a supply runner for Alexandria.
 Jordan Woods-Robinson as Eric Raleigh, Aaron's husband and former Alexandria recruiter.
 Dahlia Legault as Francine, a member of Alexandria's construction crew.
 Ted Huckabee as Bruce, a member of Alexandria's construction crew.
 Mandi Christine Kerr as Barbara, a resident of Alexandria.

The Hilltop
 R. Keith Harris as Dr. Harlan Carson, the Hilltop's doctor.
 James Chen as Kal, a Hilltop guard.
 Peter Zimmerman as Eduardo, a Hilltop guard.
 Karen Ceesay as Bertie, a resident of the Hilltop.
 Jeremy Palko as Andy, a resident of Hilltop.
 Brett Gentile as Freddie, a timid and nervous resident of the Hilltop.
 Ilan Srulovicz as Wesley, a supply runner for the Hilltop who pledges allegiance to Maggie.
 Anthony Lopez as Oscar, a supply runner for the Hilltop.

The Saviors
 Christine Evangelista as Sherry, Dwight's ex-wife and now one of Negan's "wives".
 Steven Ogg as Simon, Negan's right-hand man.
 Jayson Warner Smith as Gavin, a Savior lieutenant who deals directly with the Kingdom.
 Joshua Mikel as Jared, a volatile Savior who works with Gavin.
 Elizabeth Ludlow as Arat, a tough high-ranking Savior who is one of Negan's trusted lieutenants.
 Mike Seal as Gary, one of Negan's top lieutenants.
 Michael Scialabba as Gordon, a worker who flees the Sanctuary.
 Martinez as David, a sexually deviant Savior.
 Lindsley Register as Laura, one of Negan's top lieutenants.
 Joshua Hoover as Fat Joey, a Savior who guards Daryl's prison cell.
 Griffin Freeman as Mark, a member of the Saviors and Amber's ex-boyfriend.
 Ricky Russert as Chris, one of Negan's soldiers.
 Tim Parati as Dr. Emmett Carson, a Savior doctor and brother of Harlan Carson.
 Chloe Aktas as Tanya, one of Negan's wives.
 Elyse Dufour as Frankie, one of Negan's wives.
 Autumn Dial as Amber, Mark's ex-girlfriend and one of Negan's wives.
 Brian Stapf as Roy, a petty member of the Saviors.

The Kingdom
 Khary Payton as Ezekiel, a former zookeeper and the flamboyant leader of the Kingdom.
 Cooper Andrews as Jerry, Ezekiel's wise-cracking personal bodyguard.
 Karl Makinen as Richard, Ezekiel's right-hand-man.
 Logan Miller as Benjamin, a young member of the Kingdom who Morgan takes under his wing.
 Kerry Cahill as Dianne, a bow-wielding member of the Kingdom.
 Daniel Newman as Daniel, the first member of the Kingdom encountered.
 Carlos Navarro as Alvaro, one of Ezekiel's top soldiers.
 Macsen Lintz as Henry, a resident of the Kingdom and younger brother of Benjamin.
 Jason Burkey as Kevin, a resident of the Kingdom.
 Nadine Marissa as Nabila, a resident and gardener of the Kingdom.

Oceanside
 Deborah May as Natania, the leader of Oceanside.
 Sydney Park as Cyndie, Natania's granddaughter.
 Mimi Kirkland as Rachel, a young resident of Oceanside.
 Briana Venskus as Beatrice, one of Oceanside's top soldiers.
 Nicole Barré as Kathy, one of Oceanside's top soldiers.

The Scavengers
 Pollyanna McIntosh as Jadis, the unusual leader of the Scavengers.
 Thomas Francis Murphy as Brion, a high-ranking member of the Scavengers.
 Sabrina Gennarino as Tamiel, a high-ranking member of the Scavengers.
 Anja Akstin as Farron, a member of the Scavengers, who forms a brief rivalry with Michonne.

Production

The Walking Dead was renewed by AMC for a 16-episode seventh season on October 30, 2015. Filming for season 7 began in Georgia on May 2, 2016 and concluded on November 18, 2016. Actors Jeffrey Dean Morgan, Xander Berkeley, Tom Payne, and Austin Amelio were all promoted to series regulars for the seventh season, after having recurring roles in the sixth season. The seventh season has featured several extended episodes, running longer than its usual 43-minute running time (without commercials). Extended episodes have ranged from 46 to 62 minutes in length.

The finale was dedicated in memory of American comic artist Bernie Wrightson, who died on March 18, 2017.

Episodes

Reception

Critical response
The seventh season of The Walking Dead has received mixed reviews from critics. On Rotten Tomatoes, the season holds a score of 66% with an average rating of 6.85 out of 10 based on 18 reviews. The site's critical consensus reads: "Increased character depth and effective world-building helps The Walking Dead overcome a tiresome reliance on excessive, gratuitous violence."

The first episode of the season, "The Day Will Come When You Won't Be", received criticism for the amount of violence depicted in the episode, with one writer calling it the equivalent of "torture porn". Subsequently, the first half of the seventh season has seen some of the show's lowest critical ratings. The show's executive producer Gale Anne Hurd claimed that in light of the negative feedback, they tamed some of the more gruesome scenes that were in episodes being filmed for the second half of the season. Hurd said that "this is not a show that's torture porn... Let's make sure we don't cross that line". However, this claim was countered by executive producers Scott M. Gimple and Greg Nicotero. Gimple said that the violence used in the episode was "pronounced for a reason", specifically that "there was a purpose of traumatizing these characters to a point where maybe they would have been docile for the rest of their lives", but noted that he felt that this episode shouldn't represent "the base level of violence that necessarily should be on the show". On Rotten Tomatoes, it holds a 67% with an average rating of 7 out of 10, based on 54 reviews. The site's consensus reads: "The flashback-laden 'The Day Will Come When You Won't Be' is slow to deliver the payoff from last season's finale—but ultimately delivers with sadistic acts of gut-wrenching violence that will push Walking Dead fans to their limit."

Accolades

The series won two awards at the 43rd Saturn Awards: Best Actor on Television (Andrew Lincoln), and Best Guest Starring Role on Television (Jeffrey Dean Morgan). Additional nominations were for Best Supporting Actor on Television (Norman Reedus), Best Supporting Actress on Television (Danai Gurira and Melissa McBride), and Best Performance by a Younger Actor in a Television Series (Chandler Riggs).

The first half of the season was nominated for Outstanding Performance by a Stunt Ensemble in a Television Series at the 23rd Screen Actors Guild Awards. Additionally, for his portrayal of Negan, Jeffrey Dean Morgan earned himself a nomination and win for Best Guest Performer in a Drama Series at the 7th Critics' Choice Television Awards for the first half of the season, in addition to his guest appearance in the season six finale, "Last Day on Earth". Morgan was also nominated at the 26th MTV Movie & TV Awards for Best Actor in a TV Show and Best Villain, winning the latter.

Ratings
The Walking Deads seventh-season premiere ("The Day Will Come When You Won't Be") received 17.03 million viewers in its initial broadcast on AMC in the United States. The viewership steadily declined every week after the premiere, until the seventh episode ("Sing Me a Song"), with the sixth episode ("Swear") of the season dropping to 10.40 million viewers, the lowest rating the show has had since season three. Viewing increased to 12 million viewers in the ninth episode ("Rock in the Road"), following this viewing decreased with the twelfth episode ("Say Yes") reaching a season low with 10.16 million viewers.

 Live +7 ratings were not available, so Live +3 ratings have been used instead.

Home media
The season was released on Blu-ray and DVD in region 1 on August 22, 2017, in region 2 on September 25, 2017, and in region 4 on September 27, 2017. The "Limited Edition Spike Walker Statue" set, which is exclusive to Amazon.com was released on October 24, 2017, and was created by McFarlane Toys to pay homage to the zombie character featured in the "New Best Friends" episode in season 7.

References

External links

 
 

2016 American television seasons
2017 American television seasons
07